Golden Touch may refer to:

 "Golden Touch" (song), a song by Razorlight
 Golden Touch (album), an album by Shabba Ranks
 The Golden Touch (film), a 1935 Walt Disney Silly Symphony cartoon
 Midas, the mythological tale of the golden touch